A Man Called Jones is a 1947 mystery detective novel by British writer Julian Symons. It is the second novel in his trilogy featuring the Scotland Yard detective Chief Inspector Bland. Symons was critical of the "Great Detective" that features in so many novels during the Golden Age of Detective Fiction and demonstrates this in the climatic scene where Bland assembles all the suspects to explain his theory, only to first send them to sleep and then be confronted by the late arrival of a previously unknown character on which the whole puzzle hinges.

Synopsis
Lionel Hargreaves, son of the founder of Hargreaves Advertising Agency, is shot dead during a noisy office party.

References

Bibliography
 Bargainnier, Earl F. Twelve Englishmen of Mystery. Popular Press, 1984.
 Priestman, Martin. The Cambridge Companion to Crime Fiction. Cambridge University Press, 2003.
 Walsdorf, John J. & Allen, Bonnie J. Julian Symons: A Bibliography. Oak Knoll Press, 1996.

1947 British novels
Novels by Julian Symons
British detective novels
British crime novels
British mystery novels
Novels set in London
Victor Gollancz Ltd books